The Höganäs Ladies Open was a women's professional golf tournament on the Ladies European Tour in 1984 and 1985, and on the Swedish Golf Tour between 1986 and 1994. It was always held at Mölle Golf Club in Höganäs, Sweden. 

In 1990 Annika Sörenstam won the tournament while still an amateur, a feat Åsa Gottmo repeated in 1992.

Winners

References

External links
Ladies European Tour

Höganäs Sweden Open
Swedish Golf Tour (women) events
Golf tournaments in Sweden
Defunct sports competitions in Sweden
Recurring sporting events established in 1984
Recurring sporting events disestablished in 1994